was a Japanese samurai of the Sengoku period, who served the Asakura clan. Magara was a big man with a height of 7 shaku and was famed for his skill with the ōdachi. 

During the 1570 Battle of Anegawa, he served on the front lines, together with his son Naomoto. They supported the Asakura army's retreat from the forces of Oda Nobunaga and Tokugawa Ieyasu. As the Asakura continued to presently retreat to their original stronghold, Naotaka lost his blade, and after attempting to continue fighting bare-handed, was killed together with his son.

Atsuta Shrine owns Taro tachi (太郎太刀), a ōdachi with a blade length of ) which is said to be the sword he used. The historical book Akechi Gunki (明智軍記) states that he used a ōdachi of 7 shaku 8 sun, and Asakura Shimatsuki (朝倉始末記) states that he used a ōdachi of about 9 shaku 5 sun.

References

Turnbull, Stephen. Warriors of Medieval Japan.
 "Makara Naotaka: Shiro to kosenjō" (18 Feb. 2008)

Samurai
1536 births
1570 deaths
Japanese warriors killed in battle